The Hydropolis Underwater Hotel and Resort is a proposed underwater hotel in Dubai. It would be the first multi-room underwater hotel in the world.

The original plan was to locate it  underwater off the coast of Jumeirah Beach, although this site was later found to be unsuitable.

Originally announced in 2005, the plans had been put on hold by 2014.

Origin 
The hotel was planned in the Persian Gulf off Dubai through the mediation of the Hans Peter Pesenhofer following plans of Siemens IBC (Prof. Roland Dieterle) in cooperation with the German Designer Joachim Hauser (Bitterfeld) and with the approval of the DDIA. The hotel's original plan was to be located 20 meters underwater off the coast of Jumeriah beach. The hotel's plan is to cover an area of 260 hectares, which is equivalent in area to Hyde Park in London.[1] The construction cost for Hydropolis is approximately €600 million Euro, which will make Hydropolis one of the most expensive hotels ever created.[2] The hotel design was created by Joachim Hauser and Professor Roland Dieterle, and is planned to be composed of three segments: a land station, a connecting train, and the underwater hotel. Joachim Hauser's and Prof. Roland Dieterle's architecture idea is to represent the connection between humans and water. The initial planned opening year was 2006, but due to financial reasons and disagreements with the DDIA (Dubai Development & Investment Authority), the project was canceled by the DDIA already in October 2004. Hydropolis Holdings LLC Dubai was holding the original intellectual property rights of Hydropolis.

Land station 
The design of the land station is a wave-shaped 30,000 square meter building. The purpose of the land station is to provide a place for guests to board the soundless train to descend into the hotel.  Secondary purposes for the land station include greeting guests, and use of the land station's facilities.  The land station is planned to feature many facilities, including a marine research laboratory, a plastic surgery clinic, conference facilities, a restaurant, and a theater.  The theater is intended to feature films about the evolution of life and about the history of underwater architecture.

Power and tunnel 
This train will be powered by an automated cable propulsion system. This automated cable propulsion system consists of a stationary motor and cables with the train cars fixed to the cables. The stationary motor for the train system will be located in the land station, and will be connected to cables running down the length of the tunnel. The train cars, fixed to these cables, will be moved up and down the tunnel solely from the power of the land motor. This system is advantageous because separating the motor from the train cars will decrease noise in the tunnel. This decreases noise because the motor is the main source of noise in this train system. With the motor separate from the train cars, noise in the cars and tunnel will be minimized. Another advantage of this system is that a separate motor results in less mechanical parts in the car, which also mean less repairs on the actual train cars.

Cars and logistic Systems 
Rubber wheels were chosen over other types of wheel, such as steel, to minimize noise.  Rubber wheels have a property of making little noise as they roll on surfaces such as plexiglass.  The noiseless train will serve two purposes, transferring guests and supplying the underwater hotel.  Supplies will be packed on land, and delivered efficiently to the hotel to minimize the space taken up by goods in the hotel.  Cars transferring supplies will feature palettes, and cars transferring passengers will provide a view of the ocean.  The guest transporting aspect of the train will have a maximum efficiency of 1000 people per hour.

Underwater hotel 
The underwater hotel will be a jellyfish like structure. The underwater hotel will be located 20 meters underneath the surface of the ocean.  To handle the underwater pressures, the hotel's main structure is a dome composed of plexiglass, reinforced with concrete and steel. The underwater hotel will be composed of 220 underwater suites with a cost of $5500 per night. In addition to the underwater suites, Hydropolis is planned to have many other underwater accommodations including restaurants, a spa, a cinema, a ballroom, and bars. The underwater hotel is planned to not only be a place for regular guests, but also a place for visitors to explore.

References

External links 
 dubai.com

Proposed buildings and structures in Dubai
Hotels in Dubai